Philip William Ingham FRS, FMedSci, Hon. FRCP (born 19 March 1955 Liverpool) is a British geneticist, currently the Toh Kian Chui Distinguished Professor at the Lee Kong Chian School of Medicine, a partnership between Nanyang Technological University, Singapore and Imperial College, London. Previously, he was the inaugural Director of the Living Systems Institute at the University of Exeter, UK and prior to that was Vice Dean, Research at the Lee Kong Chian School of Medicine.

Career
Ingham was educated at Merchant Taylors' School, Crosby near Liverpool and then at Queens' College in the University of Cambridge where after initially reading Philosophy and Theology he graduated in Genetics. He gained his Doctorate of Philosophy from the University of Sussex under the supervision of J Robert S Whittle before moving to the Laboratoire de Génétique Moleculaire des Eukaryotes in Strasbourg, France, as a Royal Society European Exchange Programme fellow. He returned to the UK in 1982, joining the Imperial Cancer Research Fund (ICRF, now known as Cancer Research UK) as a post-doctoral research fellow in the laboratory of David Ish-Horowicz. After a brief spell as a Research Scientist at the MRC Laboratory of Molecular Biology in Cambridge, he re-joined the ICRF as a staff scientist, remaining there for ten years before moving to the University of Sheffield, where he established the MRC Centre for Developmental and Biomedical Genetics. He was elected a member of the European Molecular Biology Organization in 1995, a Fellow of the Academy of Medical Sciences in 2001 and Fellow of the Royal Society in 2002. In 2005 he became the second recipient of the Medal of the Genetics Society of Great Britain and in 2007 was elected an Honorary Fellow of the Royal College of Physicians. He has served on numerous international Scientific Advisory Boards and funding committees and was President of the International Society of Developmental Biologists from 2013-2017. In 2014 he was awarded the Waddington Medal by the British Society for Developmental Biology. He has lived and worked in Singapore since 2005.

Scientific Contributions
As a graduate student, Ingham isolated a novel homoeotic mutation in Drosophila, which he named trithorax (trx). Using genetic mosaic analysis, he showed that the trx gene is required for the maintenance of the determined state of cells, presaging the current understanding of the Trithorax-group proteins as key epigenetic regulators throughout the animal kingdom. Subsequently, he pioneered the molecular analysis of the process of segmentation in the Drosophila embryo, through the simultaneous analysis the expression of patterns of pair rule genes using the technique of in situ hybridisation. These studies led to his interest in what is now known as the Hedgehog signalling pathway; Ingham's genetic studies identified the core components of this pathway and in particular the role of the Patched protein as the receptor for the Hedgehog ligand. In 1993, in collaboration with Andy McMahon and Cliff Tabin, Ingham's research group discovered the vertebrate homologues of the Drosophila hedgehog gene, including Sonic hedgehog. This finding set in train a surge of interest in this pathway, leading amongst other things, to the recognition of its role in a number of human cancers and to the development of a novel anti-cancer drug that specifically targets the pathway. 
Ingham was in the vanguard of researchers to adopt the zebrafish, Danio rerio, as a model for the analysis of vertebrate development and more recently for the study of processes related to human diseases.

Publications
Ingham has authored or co-authored over 180 peer-reviewed scientific primary research papers and review articles. Notable amongst the latter are his 1988 review of the Molecular Genetics of embryonic Pattern formation in Drosophila and his 2001 review, co-authored with Andrew McMahon, on the Principles and Paradigms of Hedgehog signalling.

References

External links
Ncbi.nlm.nih.gov
Scienceblog.cancerresearchuk.org

British geneticists
1955 births
Scientists from Liverpool
Fellows of the Royal Society
Fellows of the Academy of Medical Sciences (United Kingdom)
Academics of the University of Sheffield
Alumni of the University of Sussex
Living people
Alumni of Queens' College, Cambridge